Lilia Abadjieva (born 3 November 1966) is a Bulgarian theatre director, known for her re-interpretations of Shakespeare's plays. She has taken part in a number of international festivals and received numerous awards.

Life
Lilia Abadjieva was born in Sofia.  In 1998 she was awarded a master's degree in theater direction by  the National Academy of Theatre and Film Arts in Sofia.

Work
She has been directing film and theatre productions in Eastern and Central Europe for more than ten years. Many of these productions were re-interpretations of Shakespearian tragedies. Her avant-garde work is unconventional and controversial. She describes herself as l'enfant terrible of Bulgarian theatre.

Her productions include Shakespeare's Othello, Hamlet, Romeo and Juliet, and Measure for Measure, Gogol's The Government Inspector, Goethe's The Sorrows of Young Werther, and Beckett's Waiting for Godot.

Abadjieva has taken part in international festivals in various countries.

Awards 
Amongst other awards, she received an award from the Ministry of Culture of Bulgaria for developing and disseminating Bulgarian culture, and in 2005 she won the Union of Bulgarian Artist's award for the best play of the season for her production of Othello for the Bulgarian National Theatre.

She also received awards for productions in Egypt, North Macedonia, and Russia.

See also
List of theatre directors in the 20th and 21st centuries

References

Living people
Entertainers from Sofia
Bulgarian theatre directors
1966 births